The Phillip Craft House was a historic house at 1381 Old Red Eye Road, in rural Pittsylvania County, Virginia, near the hamlet of Redeye.  It was a -story brick structure with a gabled roof.  A wood-frame addition of 20th-century construction extended to the side.  Built about 1819, it was one of the few surviving early 19th-century brick buildings in the county.

The house was listed on the National Register of Historic Places in 2001.  It was destroyed by fire on April 18, 2017.

See also
National Register of Historic Places listings in Pittsylvania County, Virginia

References

Houses on the National Register of Historic Places in Virginia
National Register of Historic Places in Pittsylvania County, Virginia
Houses completed in 1819
Buildings and structures in Pittsylvania County, Virginia
Demolished buildings and structures in Virginia